The Australian Football League draft is the annual draft of unsigned players, especially new nominations, by Australian rules football teams that participate in the main competition of that sport, the Australian Football League (AFL).

History
When the competition was known as the Victorian Football League (VFL), the league introduced the first incarnation of a draft system in 1981, where teams had two selections each of interstate players determined by reverse finishing position order.

The draft was introduced as an equalisation strategy in response to the increasing transfer fees and player salaries at the time, which in combination with declining attendances threatened to derail the league. It was also a result of the failure of country zoning, introduced in 1967, which had led to a systematic inequality whereby the clubs with the best zones, like Carlton and Hawthorn, could dominate over clubs with poorer zones like Melbourne.

In 1986, the first of the modern VFL Drafts was held. The draft was run in conjunction to the existing zone system. Players from West Australian Football League and the new West Coast Eagles were excluded from the 1986 draft, with the Eagles able to recruit up to 35 West Australian players with no more than 6 players from any single WAFL club. The other new club for the 1987 VFL season, the Brisbane Bears, received 6 concessionary picks before the other clubs and exclusive access to all Queensland based players.

Since then, the rules associated with priority picks, zone allocations, the father–son rule, mid-year, pre-season and rookie drafts, expansion clubs concessions and trading of players and picks have been frequently changed, but the basic premise of draft being an equalisation measure to assist the poorer performed teams has remained.

Draft
In the AFL draft, clubs receive picks based on the position in which they finish on the ladder during the season. The draft is held each year at the end of November, to allow the draftees to finish their school examinations before being drafted.

Eligibility
From the 2009 draft, players must be at least 18 years of age on 31 December in the year in which they are drafted, so that players who turn 18 during their first months of Year 12 will be able to finish studying without the pressure of AFL. This was increased over the past few years due to concerns about school age players potentially having to leave home to play football interstate.

A selection of approximately 50 players are chosen to attend the annual AFL Draft Combine at the conclusion of the AFL season, prior to the National Draft.  Further smaller scale state screenings are held around the country in the weeks after the national combine.

Priority draft pick rule

The priority draft picks were first introduced in the 1993 AFL Draft as a special assistance rule to aid teams that consistently perform poorly to obtain additional early draft selections.

Under the rules in place since the 2012 season, priority draft picks are given out to struggling teams at the discretion of the AFL Commission. This replaced a system in which a priority draft pick was automatically given to team whose win–loss record fell below a pre-defined value; this had become controversial, and there were accusations by commentators that teams out of finals contention would tank at the end of the season to gain access to the additional draft picks, although the AFL itself never brought such accusations against any club.

Father–son rule

To continue the traditions of association that a family has with a particular club, sons of former players are able to be selected by the same club as their father played with under the father–son rule.

For clubs with an established history in the VFL/AFL (20 years or more), the father must have played at least 100 games for the club to be eligible for the father/son rule; clubs with no long term history in the league had different eligibility criteria based on their state leagues.

Under current rules, players eligible under the father–son rule are selected in a bidding system prior to the draft. Firstly, any club in the league may nominate a draft pick with which it intends to take the eligible son; then, if the father's club wishes to draft the son, it must use its next available draft pick, after the highest bidder.

Earlier versions of the father–son rule allowed the sons to be recruited automatically, without need for the draft, or allowed the club to recruit the son using a third round draft pick. The father–son rule itself was introduced in 1949, more than three decades prior to the draft, and it could be used to contravene zoning rules.

AFL Women's: Father-daughter rule and future rules for AFL Women's players
On 15 September 2016, an AFL women's competition, the AFLW, was founded to commence in 2017. 

In its Draft, there is an equivalent father–daughter rule, where a daughter can be drafted if their father played one game at the club. The first use of this rule was in the 2017 Draft, when Carlton selected Abbie McKay, the daughter of Andrew McKay. 

Criteria are also in place for mother–son and mother–daughter rules, from such time that the children of AFLW players reach draft eligible age.

Expansion clubs
Each time that the competition has an expansion team, the AFL give special priority to the new club, with the new club receiving numerous high draft picks.

Host 
For most of its existence, the National Draft has been held at a large function or convention centre with many of the predicted top draft selections in attendance.

Since 1993, the National draft has been televised live, pick-by-pick, while the mid-year (1990–1993), pre-season and rookie drafts have never been televised.

Number-one draft picks

Men's 
As of 2021, the number one draft pick was taken by the last-placed team from the previous season, or an expansion team in its first draft, in 31 of the 38 drafts.

Years where this was not the case are:
 Where the number one pick has been traded, for example when Fremantle traded the number one pick of the 2001 AFL draft to Hawthorn for Trent Croad. Other trades took place in 1988, 1990 and 1992. 
 In 1996, where West Coast were given the first draft pick for being the lowest-ranked team to have lost an uncontracted player (Ian Downsborough) to expansion team : the team that finished last, Fitzroy, had its AFL playing operations taken over by Brisbane at the end of 1996.
 In 2002, where Carlton, who had finished last, lost their priority picks and their first and second round picks for salary cap breaches. St. Kilda, who had finished 15th of the 16 teams, received the first draft pick and selected Brendon Goddard. 
 In 2007, where , who had finished 15th of the 16 teams, received the number one draft pick by virtue of the priority pick rules at the time. The team that finished last, Richmond, received the second overall pick and also received a priority pick at the end of the first round.

Despite the expectations of the number one pick, not all have forged successful VFL/AFL careers. Adam Cooney, the first pick of the 2003 AFL draft, was the first number one draft pick to be awarded the prestigious Brownlow Medal (in 2008). In the same year, Luke Hodge, the number one pick in 2001, won the Norm Smith Medal with Hawthorn. No number one selection has yet been inducted into the Australian Football Hall of Fame. Only three number one picks have won a premiership (Drew Banfield, Luke Hodge, and Tom Boyd).

The following is a list of the number one overall draft picks since the draft's inception in 1981:

After the 2021 AFL season, in which North Melbourne finished last, Port Adelaide is the only club never to have had the first overall selection of an AFL Draft.

Women's 
With the introduction of a women's competition in 2016 (to commence in 2017), a draft was set up for the AFLW.

In 2016, the first draft pick was awarded to the GWS Giants by lot, though this selection would be taken after 16 selections were made for marquee players: Nicola Barr was the first player to be drafted in AFLW history.

As of 2022, five of the six seasons have seen the first pick go to the club who finished last, or an expansion club in its first draft: in 2017, GWS traded the first pick to the Western Bulldogs, while in 2019, expansion club Richmond traded the first pick to the Western Bulldogs.

In 2018, the first pick was awarded to Geelong  as one of the expansion clubs for the 2019 season, and in 2022, the first pick awarded to Sydney as one of the expansion clubs for Season 7: in both years, this was determined by lot from the four expansion clubs.

Pre-season draft

Rookie draft 

Held at the same time as the pre-season draft, the rookie draft is a chance for clubs to recruit players for their Rookie list. Rookies are usually picked as young, developing players and can be elevated from the rookie list during the year, if there is a long-term injury or retirement to a senior player in the team. Once the rookie is elevated, he remains that way until the end of the year, where they can be officially upgraded to the senior list, or placed back on the rookie list, or delisted/not offered a new contract. Teams are allowed to have four to six rookies, but the Queensland and NSW teams may have more. The first rookie draft was the 1997 rookie draft (which followed the 1996 AFL draft and is technically lumped in with this draft for recordkeeping purposes).

International rookies
Rookies are also available to be selected from overseas countries and players on the list do not count towards the salary cap. Notable examples are Irish Tommy Walsh of Sydney; Canadian Mike Pyke of Sydney, a former rugby union international; and Americans Seamus McNamara and Mason Cox, both former college basketball players who were rookie listed by Collingwood.

In 2006, the AFL introduced a new scheme where clubs can maintain two international rookies (excluding Irish players) outside of the regular rookie list.

The rule was adjusted in 2010 to group international rookies with players recruited from other sports, and refers to them as Category B rookies.  Up to three can be listed in addition to up to six Category A rookies.

See also
AFL salary cap
AFL Women's draft

References

External links
 Official AFL draft page
 AFL draft Information
 AFL draft news and player profiles

 
History of Australian rules football
Annual sporting events in Australia
Recurring sporting events established in 1981
1981 establishments in Australia